Pempeliella sororiella is a species of moth in the family Pyralidae. It is found in southern Europe, Turkey and Iran.

The wingspan is about 20 mm.

References

External links
lepiforum.de

Moths described in 1839
Phycitini
Moths of Europe
Insects of Turkey